Varallo may refer to:

Persons 
 Varallo (surname)
 Tanzio da Varallo (c. 1575/1580 – c. 1632/1633), Italian painter

Places 
 Varallo Pombia, an Italian comune in the province of Novara
 Varallo Sesia, an Italian comune in the province of Vercelli
 Novara–Varallo railway
 Varallo Sesia railway station
 Varallo's, the oldest restaurant in Tennessee